Gorodishchi is a rural locality (a village) in Denyatinskoye Rural Settlement, Melenkovsky District, Vladimir Oblast, Russia. The population was 18 as of 2010. There are 3 streets.

Geography 
Gorodishchi is located on the Zhernovka River, 36 km northeast of Melenki (the district's administrative centre) by road. Prosenitsy is the nearest rural locality.

References 

Rural localities in Melenkovsky District